The 2016 Inter-Provincial Cup was the fourth season of the Inter-Provincial Cup, the domestic List A cricket competition of Ireland. The competition is played between Leinster Lightning, Northern Knights and North-West Warriors.

The championship is in Strategic Plan of Cricket Ireland success to achieve Test Status for the national team.

Standings

Squads

Fixtures

1st match

2nd match

3rd match

4th match

5th match

6th match

References

External links 

 cricketarchive Page
 Series Home

See also 

 2016 Inter-Provincial Championship
 2016 Inter-Provincial Trophy

Inter
Inter-Provincial Cup seasons